Segun Afolabi is a Nigerian novelist and short story writer, born in Kaduna, Nigeria, in 1966.

He is the son of a career diplomat with his wife. With his family, he moved frequently throughout his childhood, from country to country in Africa, Asia, Europe, and North America. Several critics have remarked on this experience as an obvious influence on his writing. 

Afolabi won the 2005 Caine Prize for the story "Monday Morning", first published in Wasafiri, issue 41, spring 2004. His first novel, Goodbye Lucille, was published in April 2007 and won the Authors' Club First Novel Award. He was shortlisted for the Caine Prize in 2015.

References

Nigerian writers
1966 births
People from Kaduna
Living people
21st-century Nigerian writers
Nigerian male short story writers
Nigerian short story writers
Caine Prize winners
21st-century short story writers
21st-century male writers